Munir Ahmed is the name of:
Munir Ahmed Badini (born 1953), Balochi language novelist
Munir Ahmed Khan (1926–1999), Pakistani nuclear scientist
Munir Ahmad Rashid (born 1934), Pakistani mathematician and nuclear scientist
Munir Ahmed Mengal, head of Baloch Voice TV
Munir Ahmed (cricketer, born 1970), international cricketer for Austria
Munir Dar (cricketer, born 1974), international cricketer for Hong Kong
Munir Ahmed Dar (field hockey), silver medalist in 1956 and 1964 Summer Olympics